Claymont station is a station along the SEPTA Wilmington/Newark Line and Amtrak's Northeast Corridor in Claymont, Delaware; Amtrak services do not stop here and the station is only served by SEPTA. This station is the first stop in Delaware, continuing towards Wilmington and Newark. It is located at Myrtle & Marion Avenues and includes a 509 space parking lot. The line offers southbound service to Wilmington and Newark, Delaware and northbound service to Philadelphia. The south end of the station contains a long pedestrian bridge that crosses over Interstate 495 to Governor Printz Boulevard.

History
Claymont station was originally built by the Pennsylvania Railroad as a commuter rail stop between Philadelphia and Wilmington. Service passed on to the Penn Central Railroad in 1968 and Conrail in 1976. The former depot, built by the Pennsylvania Railroad, burned down on July 25, 1981. When SEPTA took over service from Conrail on January 1, 1983, Claymont station was closed as service in Delaware was eliminated. Claymont station reopened to SEPTA service in 1991, with retrofitted bus shelters constructed at the station.

Future
The current Claymont station is slated to be replaced with the Claymont Regional Transportation Center. Plans for the new station date back to 2005. On July 29, 2016, the Claymont Regional Transportation Center received a $10 million Transportation Investment Generating Economic Recovery (TIGER) grant from the U.S. Department of Transportation. The new station is projected to cost $71 million. Construction on the Claymont Regional Transportation Center began in spring 2019 with completion expected in fall 2023.

Station layout
Claymont has two low-level side platforms with walkways connecting passengers to the inner tracks. Amtrak's Northeast Corridor lines bypass the station via the inner tracks.

References

External links

SEPTA – Claymont Station
 Station from Google Maps Street View

SEPTA Regional Rail stations
DART First State
Stations on the Northeast Corridor
Railway stations in Delaware
Transportation buildings and structures in New Castle County, Delaware
Railway stations closed in 1983
Railway stations in the United States opened in 1991
Wilmington/Newark Line